Jars of Clay has been successful in being nominated for and winning several awards, including prestigious Grammy Awards and several of the Christian music awards, known as the GMA Dove Awards. Some of these successes have been collaborative efforts, including two City on a Hill albums and the inspired collaboration for the 2005 film The Chronicles of Narnia: The Lion, the Witch and the Wardrobe. The group has won five BMI Awards from Broadcast Music Incorporated.

GMA Dove Awards

Grammy Awards

Broadcast Music Incorporated

The following songs were awarded by BMI as some of the most performed songs in their genre:

American Music Awards

References

Awards
Lists of awards received by American musician
Lists of awards received by musical group